Doğanyurt is a village in the Çine district of Aydın province, Turkey, formerly called Araphisar.

Doğanyurt is 9 km from the district seat, Çine, and 47 km from the province seat, Aydin.

The ruins of ancient Alabanda are found in the village and the surrounding fields.

Villages in Çine District
Caria